Gaetano Manfredi (Ottaviano, 4 January 1964) is an Italian university professor and politician. He has been mayor of Naples since 2021, and has served as the Minister of University and Research in the second government of Giuseppe Conte from 2020 to 2021.

Academic career 
Manfredi previously served as rector of University of Naples.

Political career

Minister of University and Research 
Manfredi has overseen the response to the COVID-19 outbreak in Italy in relation to Italian universities. Manfredi announced that online lessons would be delivered to students in key areas most affected by the outbreak starting from 2 March 2020.

Mayor of Naples 
He was elected as Mayor of Naples in the 2021 Naples municipal election.

References 

Living people
1964 births
Mayors of Naples
Conte II Cabinet
Engineers from Naples
People from Ottaviano
21st-century Italian engineers
University of Naples Federico II alumni